Bring may refer to:
 Erland Samuel Bring (1736-1798), Swedish mathematician
 Bring, a postal service from Posten Norge

Brang may refer to:
 Peter Paul Brang, Viennese architect
 Maran Brang Seng, Burmese politician

See also
 
 
 
 
 
 
 Bringer (disambiguation)
 Carry (disambiguation)